Glyphipterix plagiographa is a species of sedge moth in the genus Glyphipterix. It was described by John David Bradley in 1965 and is found in Uganda.

References

Moths described in 1965
Glyphipterigidae
Moths of Africa